(), also referred to as simply  or , is a Finland-Swedish academic women's choir in Turku, Finland.

Overview
The choir was formed in 1944.

Notes

Citations

References

External links

 Official website 
 Åbo Akademi University

University choirs
Women's choirs
Finnish choirs
Musical groups established in 1944
1944 establishments in Finland
Finland Swedish